When Men Carried Clubs and Women Played Ding-Dong is a 1971 film directed by Bruno Corbucci.

Critical response 
The film received negative reviews; the "Segnalazioni Cinematografiche”, for example, saw in it

References

External links

1971 films
1971 comedy films
Italian comedy films
1970s Italian-language films
1970s Italian films